James Locy Hallock (January 25, 1823 – September 21, 1894) was an American carpenter, farmer, and politician.

Born in Pittston, Pennsylvania, Hallock worked as a carpenter and for the railroad. In 1852, Hallock went to California and took part in the California Gold Rush. In 1855, Hallock and his wife settled in the town of Nelson, Buffalo County, Wisconsin. Hallock was a farmer and raised cattle and horses. Hallock served as chairman of the Nelson Town Board and on the Buffalo County Board of Supervisors. In 1870, Hallock served in the Wisconsin State Assembly and was a Republican.

Notes

External links

1823 births
1894 deaths
People from Pittston, Pennsylvania
People from Buffalo County, Wisconsin
People of the California Gold Rush
Farmers from Wisconsin
County supervisors in Wisconsin
Mayors of places in Wisconsin
19th-century American politicians
Republican Party members of the Wisconsin State Assembly